USS Pride (DE-323) was an Edsall-class destroyer escort built for the U.S. Navy during World War II. She served in the Atlantic Ocean the Pacific Ocean and provided destroyer escort protection against submarine and air attack for Navy vessels and convoys. She returned home at war's end with three battle stars and then entered into service for the U.S. Coast Guard before final decommissioning.

Namesake
Lewis Bailey Pride, Jr. was born on 22 April 1919 in Miami, Florida. He appointed Midshipman from Kentucky 23 June 1937. He was commissioned an Ensign 7 February 1941, and reported on board  on 13 March 1941. He was killed in the Japanese Attack on Pearl Harbor, 7 December 1941.

Construction and commissioning
She was laid down by the Consolidated Steel Co., Orange, Texas, 12 April 1943; launched 3 July 1943; sponsored by Mrs. Lewis Bailey Pride, mother of Lewis Bailey Pride, Jr.; and commissioned 13 November 1943.

World War II North Atlantic operations
 
After shakedown off Bermuda, Pride spent the next twelve months escorting six convoys into the Mediterranean. On 20 April 1944 during the second voyage German planes attacked Convoy UGS–38 at dusk off Algiers, and sank five ships, including a transport carrying 500 soldiers, and destroyer .

Sinking German Submarine U-371 

Sinking of German Submarine U-866 
 
She then joined a North Atlantic escort carrier group assigned to search out and destroy U-boats before they gained access to the shipping lanes. Bv the end of European hostilities, 5 of the 6 submarines known to be in the area were destroyed. The 6th surrendered shortly after V-E Day.
 
She then escorted two transports to Liverpool, whence she steamed back across the Atlantic to Panama where she conducted submarine training exercises until late in 1945.

Decommissioning 

On 29 December she reported to the Atlantic Reserve Fleet at Green Cove Springs, Florida. On 26 April 1946 Pride decommissioned at Green Cove Springs. In 1961 she was moved to Orange, Texas. She was struck from the Navy List on 2 January 1971 and sold for scrapping 30 January 1974.

Awards 
 
Pride earned three battle stars for World War II service.

References

External links 

 NavSource Online: Destroyer Escort Photo Archive - USS Pride (DE-323)

Edsall-class destroyer escorts
Ships built in Orange, Texas
1943 ships
World War II frigates and destroyer escorts of the United States
Ships of the United States Coast Guard